An unorganized machine is a concept mentioned in a 1948 report in which Alan Turing suggested that the infant human cortex was what he called an "unorganised machine".

Overview
Turing defined the class of unorganized machines as largely random in their initial construction, but capable of being trained to perform particular tasks. Turing's unorganized machines were in fact very early examples of randomly connected, binary neural networks, and Turing claimed that these were the simplest possible model of the nervous system. 

Turing had been interested in the possibility of simulating neural systems for at least the previous two years.  In correspondence with William Ross Ashby in 1946 he writes:

In his 1948 paper Turing defined two examples of his unorganized machines. The first were A-type machines — these being essentially randomly connected networks of NAND logic gates. The second were called B-type machines, which could be created by taking an A-type machine and replacing every inter-node connection with a structure called a connection modifier — which itself is made from A-type nodes. The purpose of the connection modifiers were to allow the B-type machine to undergo "appropriate interference, mimicking education" in order to organize the behaviour of the network to perform useful work. Before the term genetic algorithm was coined, Turing even proposed the use of what he called a genetical search to configure his unorganized machines. Turing claimed that the behaviour of B-type machines could be very complex when the number of nodes in the network was large, and stated that the "picture of the cortex as an unorganized machine is very satisfactory from the point of view of evolution and genetics".

Notes

External links 
 Turing's correspondence regarding simulation of neural systems

Alan Turing